Terence William Gennoe (born 16 March 1953) is an English former professional footballer who made more than 400 appearances in the Football League playing as a goalkeeper for Bury, Halifax Town, Southampton and on loan at Crystal Palace, before spending a decade at Blackburn Rovers, from 1981 until 1991. He then went into coaching, and was Blackburn Rovers' goalkeeping coach before joining Newcastle United (for two spells), Celtic and Aston Villa.

Biography

Playing career
Gennoe began his career at Bury and moved to Halifax Town making 78 league appearances, then to Southampton, where he played against Nottingham Forest in the 1979 League Cup Final and made 36 league appearances for the club, then onto Crystal Palace (on loan), making three league appearances, before moving to Blackburn Rovers, where he made 289 league appearances in his decade at the club. Gennoe still holds the club record for the most league appearances by a Rovers goalkeeper. Brad Friedel left Blackburn after eight seasons in 2008, having made 287 league appearances, just two matches short of Gennoe's club record.

Coaching career
Gennoe retired from playing in 1991 but continued as a goalkeeping coach at Ewood Park. Gennoe's 16-year stint at Ewood Park ended over a contract dispute in 1997 but he was soon back working for Kenny Dalglish and Shay Given at St James' Park. Gennoe left Tyneside in 1999 to take up a similar post at Celtic, where he remained until 2005.

On 4 July 2006, Gennoe returned to Tyneside for a second spell.

In September 2011, Gennoe returned after three seasons out of the game to be the new first team goalkeeping coach at Villa Park, replacing Rafa Gonzalez. Gennoe was reunited with Shay Given, who he had previously coached at Rovers and the Magpies, with Gennoe also coaching Brad Guzan and Andy Marshall at the Birmingham club. Gennoe left the Midlands club in March 2016, after the club manager, Remi Garde departed, with Gennoe being replaced by Gary Walsh.

Honours

As a player
Southampton
League Cup runners-up: 1979

References

External links

1953 births
Living people
English footballers
Bury F.C. players
Southampton F.C. players
Crystal Palace F.C. players
Blackburn Rovers F.C. players
Newcastle United F.C. non-playing staff
English Football League players
Halifax Town A.F.C. players
Blackburn Rovers F.C. non-playing staff
Celtic F.C. non-playing staff
Aston Villa F.C. non-playing staff
Association football goalkeepers
Association football goalkeeping coaches